Philippa Anne Martin is a New Zealand electrical engineering academic and a senior member of the Institute of Electrical and Electronics Engineers. She is currently a full professor at the University of Canterbury.

Academic career

After a 2001 PhD titled Adaptive iterative decoding: block turbo codes and multilevel codes at the University of Canterbury, she moved to the University of Hawaii before returning to Canterbury and rising to full professor.

From 2005 to 2008 and from 2015 to 2016, she was an editor for the IEEE Transactions on Wireless Communications journal.

Selected works 
 Tee, James SK, Desmond P. Taylor, and Philippa A. Martin. "Multiple serial and parallel concatenated single parity-check codes." IEEE Transactions on Communications 51, no. 10 (2003): 1666–1675.
 Hanif, Muhammad Fainan, Peter J. Smith, Desmond P. Taylor, and Philippa A. Martin. "MIMO cognitive radios with antenna selection." IEEE Transactions on Wireless Communications 10, no. 11 (2011): 3688–3699.
 Martin, Philippa A., Desmond P. Taylor, and Marc PC Fossorier. "Soft-input soft-output list-based decoding algorithm." In Information Theory, 2002. Proceedings. 2002 IEEE International Symposium on, p. 339. IEEE, 2002.
 Vitetta, Giorgio, Desmond P. Taylor, Giulio Colavolpe, Fabrizio Pancaldi, and Philippa A. Martin. Wireless communications: algorithmic techniques. John Wiley & Sons, 2013.
 Martin, Philippa A., and Desmond P. Taylor. "On multilevel codes and iterative multistage decoding." IEEE Transactions on Communications 49, no. 11 (2001): 1916–1925.

References

External links
 

Living people
Year of birth missing (living people)
New Zealand women academics
University of Canterbury alumni
Academic staff of the University of Canterbury
New Zealand electrical engineers
University of Hawaiʻi faculty
New Zealand women writers